, also known professionally as , is a Japanese singer and voice actor. He is a member and leader of the 4 member Japanese boy band Urashimasakatasen.

Life and career

Early life 

2009–present 
He has been working under the stage name Uratanuki on NicoNico Douga and YouTube since 2009. His image color is green. The name of his listener is Kotanuki. The name of his raccoon dog on his shoulder is Yamadanuki.

Uratanuki is named after his real name "Wataru" in Roman letters (Wataru), and when read from behind, it becomes "Urata". At that time, his names including animal names were popular, together with the most comfortable Tanuki (raccoon), it became Uratanuki

Tonari no sakata, Shima and Senra, was a member of the Urashimasakatasen, He is on good terms with the  singers Mafumafu, Soraru, Amatsuki and others. 

Every Monday, they have a distribution called Monday of Urashimasakatasen (浦島坂田船のげつようび。) live on Niconico douga, Twitcasting and Youtube

Filmography

Anime

Film

OVA

ONA

Discography

Album

Single

Voice Drama CD

References

External links 
  (in Japanese)

1989 births
Living people
Japanese male singers
Japanese male voice actors
People from Saitama Prefecture
Utaite